{{DISPLAYTITLE:C16H8}}
The molecular formula C16H8 (molar mass: 200.24 g/mol, exact mass: 200.0626 u) may refer to:

 Bicalicene
 Quadrannulene

See also
List of compounds with carbon number 16

Molecular formulas